Aleksandr Anatolyevich Kishinevsky (born 7 May 1954) is a Russian professional football coach and a former player. He is the manager of FC Yenisey-2 Krasnoyarsk.

Club career
As a player, he made his debut in the Soviet Second League in 1972 for FC Avtomobilist Krasnoyarsk.

Kishinevsky played in the Soviet First League with FC Kuzbass Kemerovo and FC SKA Rostov-on-Don.

Honours
 Russian Second Division Zone East best manager: 2005.

References

1954 births
Footballers from Baku
Living people
Soviet footballers
FC SKA Rostov-on-Don players
Russian football managers
Association football midfielders
FC Yenisey Krasnoyarsk players